Hi Honey – I'm Dead is a 1991 Fox Network made-for-TV film starring Curtis Armstrong and Catherine Hicks.

Plot summary
Brad Stadler is a dishonest real estate developer who spends too much time at work. He cheats on his wife and has no time for son Josh's baseball games. God decides that Brad's time has come. After an accident at his construction site, he is given a new body and identity as Arnold Pischkin. A wisecracking angel named Ralph explains everything to Brad and that he must make up for his sins to go to heaven. Brad has to get used to his new life without money and good looks. He becomes the housekeeper for his widow and son. He becomes a better man by doing many good deeds.

Cast
 Curtis Armstrong as Arnold Pischkin
 Catherine Hicks as Carol Stadler
 Kevin Conroy as Brad Stadler
 Joseph Gordon-Levitt as Josh Stadler
Robert Briscoe Evans as Noel
 Harvey Jason as Dr. Jahundi
 Jerry Hardin as Cal
 Paul Rodriguez as Ralph, the angel 
 Gregory Itzin as Phil
Carole Androsky as Wife Mourner
Andre Rosey Brown as Guard
Betty Carvalho as Maria
Wendy Cutler as Newsperson
Andy Goldberg as Caterer

External links
 

1991 television films
1991 films
Films directed by Alan Myerson
Fox network original films